SBPS may refer to:
 the ICAO airport code for Porto Seguro Airport
 Special boiling point spirit